EtherSound is an audio-over-Ethernet technology for audio engineering and broadcast engineering applications. EtherSound is developed and licensed by Digigram.
  
EtherSound is intended by the developer to be compliant with IEEE 802.3 Ethernet standards. Just as the IEEE defines rates such as 100 Megabit and Gigabit Ethernet standards, EtherSound has been developed as both ES-100 (for use on dedicated 100 Megabit Ethernet networks or within a Gigabit network as a VLAN) and ES-Giga (for use on dedicated Gigabit Ethernet networks). The two versions of EtherSound are not compatible.

Network technology
While Ethersound is compliant with the IEEE 802.3 physical layer standards, logically it uses a token passing scheme of transporting audio data which prevents all of its features from being used on a standard Ethernet network. On a standard network, it is only able to distribute audio and control data one way. It is not designed to share Ethernet LANs with typical office operations data or Internet traffic such as email. It supports two-way communications only when wired in a daisy chain topology. For this reason Ethersound is best used in applications suitable to a daisy chain network topology or in live sound applications that benefit from its low point-to-point latency.

Low latency
Low latency is important for many users of audio over Ethernet technologies. EtherSound can deliver up to 64 channels of 48 kHz, 24-bit PCM audio data with a network latency of 125 microseconds.

If including A/D and D/A conversions, this latency is about 1.5 milliseconds, the major part of
this latency being caused by the converters. Each device in a daisy-chain network adds 1.4 microseconds of latency. 

EtherSound's network latency is stable and deterministic; The delay between any two devices on an EtherSound network can be calculated.

EtherSound Licensees

The following companies have licensed the EtherSound technology.

 Allen & Heath

 Amadeus

 Apex Audio
 Archean Technologies

 Audio Performance

 AuviTran

 AuxTran
 Barix

 Bittner Audio
 Bouyer
 CAMCO Audio
 Crest

 DiGiCo
 Digigram
 Focusrite

 Fostex
 Innovason
 Klein + Hummel

 LabX technologies
 Martin Audio
 Mediachip
 Nexo
 Peavey Electronics
 Pinanson
 QSC
 Richmond Sound Design

 Studer

 VTG Audio
 Whirlwind
 Yamaha Corporation

Notes

References

External links

 EtherSound website

Audio engineering
Audio network protocols
Ethernet